Ferryville may refer to:

Ferryville, Wisconsin
 Ferryville (Menzel Bourguiba), Tunisia